Francesco Stella (1862–1940) was an Italian set designer, artist-painter, and decorator.

Stella was born in Rome and studied art in his hometown under the guidance of teacher Luigi Alessandro Bazzani. He went to Argentina in 1897, and was hired to perform the wall decorations at the private residence of then President of the Republic, José Evaristo Uriburu. Later he decorated the churches of San Carlos and Our Lady of Sion, in Buenos Aires, and Our Lady of the Rosary (now Cathedral) in Santa Fe.

Stella was noted as an artist who traveled, who made different art-works in Spain, Greece, and Egypt, etc. Approximately between 1911 and 1924 he was engaged by the Teatro Colón of Buenos Aires, where he performed a scenographic work as an artist and set-designer for various performances of opera and ballet.

He was father of Ugo Stella (1891–1953), the Italian designer and restorer of historic buildings.  He died in 1940 in Buenos Aires.

External links
 Reference
 
 
 FRANCESCO STELLA(Google pages)

1862 births
1940 deaths
Painters from Rome
19th-century Italian painters
Italian male painters
20th-century Italian painters
Italian set decorators
Italian emigrants to Argentina
19th-century Italian male artists
20th-century Italian male artists